Manteca! is an album by composer/arranger/keyboardist Clare Fischer, released in November 1965 on the Pacific Jazz label. Following his previous album, So Danço Samba, devoted primarily to the music of Antonio Carlos Jobim, and to the bossa nova in general, with this, his first devoted to Afro-Cuban jazz (even reinterpreting one of Jobim's compositions accordingly). Fischer also used the occasion to unveil what would become his second bona fide jazz standard, Morning.

Track listing

Side One
 "Manteca" (W.G. Fuller-J. Gillespie) - 3:40
 "El Toro" (Mongo Santamaria) - 3:31
 "Morning" (Clare Fischer) - 4:05
 "Afro Blue" (Mongo Santamaria) - 3:30
Side Two
 "Favela" (O Morro) (Antonio Carlos Jobim) - 4:10
"Marguerite (Suegra)" (Clare Fischer) - 2:28
"Dulzura" (Clare Fischer) - 3:12
"Sway" (Pablo Beltran Ruiz) - 2:45                                         
 "Negrita" (Rudy Calzado) - 3:13

Personnel
Side One
Clare Fischer - organ
Conte Candoli, Bobby Bryant, Don Smith, and A.D. Brisbois - trumpet
Gil Falco and Bob Edmondson - trombone
Ernie Tack - bass trombone
Ralph Peña - bass
Nicholas "Cuco" Martinez - timbales
Adolfo "Chino" Valdes and Carlos Vidal - conga
Rudy Calzado - cencero and güiro

Side Two
Clare Fischer - piano
Richard West - bass
Nicholas "Cuco" Martinez - timbales
Adolfo "Chino" Valdes and Carlos Vidal - conga
Rudy Calzado - cencero and güiro

References

External links 
 Album back cover at Blogspot

1965 albums
Clare Fischer albums
Jazz albums by American artists
Pacific Jazz Records albums